Jamie Beaton (born 1995) is a New Zealand entrepreneur. The son of property managers, Beaton was born and raised in Auckland where he attended King's College on an academic scholarship and was the school valedictorian. He founded an education mentoring enterprise, Crimson Education, at age 17. 

By the time he was 20, Beaton had acquired several other enterprises which operated in partnership with Crimson Consulting. As of 2016, the enterprise was valued at over 75 million and had attracted investments from three billionaires with Beaton owning just under half of its shares. In the same year, at age 20, he graduated Harvard University with a masters degree in applied mathematics. Beaton completed this course in only three years, despite the typical time to complete the degree being five. In 2022 a capital raise by a venture capital fund valued Crimson at US$550 million. Beaton became the youngest ever New Zealander to create a "unicorn" (a private company valued at $1 billion or more) in local currency as of October 15th 2022 at age 27. .

Early life 

Beaton was born and raised in Auckland, where his parents were property manager. His mother separated from his father while she was pregnant with Beaton. Beaton's father was not involved in his upbringing, and both of his parents later remarried. He undertook his preparatory education at Saint Kentigern School, where he won a written language prize in year two. His mother has stated he showed signs of competitiveness from an early age, stating that one "just had to suggest something...he'd [become] immediately competitive...even [with things he was never good at]...he was always really competitive". 

For his secondary education he attended King's College on an academic scholarship which partly covered the fees. During his time at King's College, Beaton was the editor of the student newspaper and captain of the Amnesty International club. He joined Young Mensa and became its national coordinator, maintained a part-time job at a local fast-food restaurant, and was the school valedictorian on graduation. 

After finishing school, Beaton applied to 25 of the top universities in the world and received an offer from each. Beaton went on to study and complete six degrees, including a bachelors degree and masters degree from Harvard University (graduating in 2016) and a PhD from Oxford University. He took only three years to complete his bachelors and masters degree in applied mathematics from Harvard, with the typical time to complete the course being five years.  he was partway through a law degree from Yale Law School.

Business 
Beaton's business, Crimson Education, helps to prepare students for admission to prestigious universities and was founded in 2013 with co-founders Fangzhou Jiang and Sharndre Kushor. The business attracted investments from several New Zealand investors, including at least three billionaires, to the sum of 1.4 million. Hedge fund managers Julian Robertson and Chase Coleman, as well as Alex Robertson and Soichiro Fukutake were the primary initial investors. As of 2016, the enterprise was valued at over 75 million and had attracted investments from three billionaires with Beaton owning just under half of its shares. Crimson Education is mostly branded on Beaton, using him as a role model to prospective applicants of prestigious universities. Customers of Crimson Education have reported paying tens of thousands of dollars for tutoring services when attempting to gain entry to an Ivy League school. In 2016, as a result of Crimson's acquisition of a medical tutoring service, more than half of all successful applicants to a New Zealand medical program were Crimson customers. 

Crimson Education states that it assists students to decide on a strategy to successfully complete a program they have been admitted to by providing guidance on deciding what subjects to complete, what extracurricular activities in which to participate, and broader advice on student life. 

In 2021, former Australian Prime Minister Kevin Rudd joined the advisory board of the business. 

, the business has 630 fulltime staff and more than 3,000 tutors and mentors. In the same year a capital raise by a venture capital fund valued the company at 550 million.

Controversies and lawsuits 
In 2017, Crimson Education was involved in a breach of contract litigation with a former employee. The matter was eventually subject to a confidential settlement. In 2018, the University of Auckland filed suit against a Crimson Education subsidiary, alleging breach of copyright. The suit was eventually settled. 

In January 2021 it was reported that a $10 million High Court lawsuit had been filed by a competitor of Crimson involving allegations of employee poaching. Beaton had also filed a civil assault claim against the owner of that competitor. When asked for comment by the media, Crimson Education said it was not unusual for companies like Crimson to "experience some commercial litigation" but would not comment on the assault claim filed by Beaton. In May 2022 it was reported that the parties had reached a confidential settlement.

Personal life 
Beaton was in a relationship with Crimson Education co-founder Sharndre Kushor. Beaton and Kushor met during their secondary education at a model United Nations conference. Together, they went on to represent New Zealand's model United Nations youth delegation in The Hague.  they are no longer in a relationship.

Beaton is said to admire Facebook founder Mark Zuckerberg, with Beaton stating "he's very inspirational to me."  Beaton enjoys watching films in his spare time, and enjoys visiting theme parks.

Politics 
Beaton has praised former New Zealand Prime Minister John Key, stating "It's not his views; more the fact he left New Zealand with his skills, succeeded abroad, showed that Kiwis can reach high and achieve abroad, and then came home and made an impact."

After losing the 2020 election, the centre-right New Zealand National Party announced a review into its election campaign, and Beaton sat on the review panel.

References 

1995 births
Living people
New Zealand businesspeople
Harvard University alumni
Stanford University alumni
Alumni of the University of Oxford
Tsinghua University alumni
University of Auckland alumni
Businesspeople from Auckland
People educated at King's College, Auckland